Dengta is a city in east-central Liaoning province in Northeast China.

Administrative Divisions
There are three subdistricts, 12 towns and one township under the city's administration.

Subdistricts:
Wanbaoqiao Subdistrict, Yantai Subdistrict, Gucheng Subdistrict

Towns:
Dengta Town, Huazi, Zhangtaizi, Xidayao, Tong'erpu, Shendanbao, Liutiaozhai, Ximafeng, Wangjia, Liuhezi, Luodatai, Dahenan

The only township is Jiguanshan Township

References

External links

County-level divisions of Liaoning
Liaoyang